Hot Chicken Flavor Ramen or buldak-bokkeum-myeon (fire chicken stir-fried noodles) is a South Korean brand of instant noodle, produced by Samyang Foods since April 2012. The large cup ramyeon debuted in June 2012, and a smaller cup was released in November 2013. It is considered one of the spiciest instant noodles available in the Korean market, with the original packet having 4,404 Scoville units. It is a type of 'stir-fried' dry noodle: after boiling, the noodles are drained, and mixed with a spicy sauce and a topping. Buldak-bokkeum-myeon became famous due to the Fire Noodle Challenge, a viral social media challenge where people film themselves attempting to complete a packet or bowl of these noodles.

Buldak-bokkeum-myeon is Samyang's best-selling product. 100 million cumulative sales were reached in March 2014, and the brand attained monthly sales of 6 to 7 billion won the following year (5.1 to 5.9 million United States dollars).  From the second half of 2016, as exports of this product increased, they became the company's best-seller. In 2017, the Buldak range accounted for more than 85% of Samyang Food's total exports and 55% of total sales. In 2016, when “Buldak-bokkeummyeon” began to be sold in earnest, Samyang Foods' sales grew 23.5% to 35.9 billion won, followed by a double-digit growth rate in 2017 with a sales of 450 billion won (estimated value). For this reason, Samyang Foods received the '100 Million Dollar Export Tower' at the '54th Trade Day 2017' event.

Types
Since the release of the original in 2012 and subsequent success, Samyang has released varieties that differ in spice and often flavour from the original to keep up with demand.

Surge in popularity 
The popularity of the noodles worldwide surged when The Fire Noodle Challenge went viral on YouTube. The challenge was first started by the YouTube Channel "Korean Englishman" in 2014, in which Josh Carrott, the main host of the channel, challenged his friends in the UK to see who could finish the noodles the fastest without drinking any water or beverage to cool the heat down. The popularity of the video led to other YouTubers all around the world to do the same challenge and therefore cause a surge in the noodle's popularity.

Mascot 
The mascot of the Hot Chicken Flavor Ramen series is a chicken named "Hochi".

See also

 Buldak
Instant noodle
Korean cuisine

References

External links 
 Hot Chicken Flavor Ramen – Samyang Food

South Korean brands
Instant noodle brands